Sophia means "wisdom" in Greek. It may refer to:
Sophia (wisdom) 
Sophia (Gnosticism)
Sophia (given name)

Places
Niulakita or Sophia, an island of Tuvalu
Sophia, Georgetown, a ward of Georgetown, Guyana
Sophia, North Carolina, an unincorporated community in Randolph County
Sophia, West Virginia
Sofia, Bulgaria, the capital and largest city of Bulgaria

Arts, entertainment and media

Books and publications
Sophia (journal), a periodical about religious and theological philosophy
Sophia (novel)  by Charlotte Lennox (1762)

Music
Sophia (British band)
Sophia (Japanese band)
Sophia (singer) or Sophia Abrahão, pop singer from Brazil
Sophia (The Crüxshadows EP)
Sophia (Sophia Abrahão EP)
"Sophia" (Nerina Pallot song)
"Sophia" (Laura Marling song)
"Sophia", a song by Good Shoes from Think Before You Speak
"Sophia", a song by Laura Nyro from Mother's Spiritual
"Sophia", a song by Six Organs of Admittance from Dust and Chimes

Other
Sophia 3rd, a fictional tank in the video game Blaster Master

Organizations
Ecclesia Pistis Sophia, a neo-Gnostic church
Society for the Promotion of Himalayan Indigenous Activities (SOPHIA), nongovernmental organization based in Dehradun, Uttarakhand, India (1996)

Other uses
Sophia (robot), a humanoid robot and Saudi Arabian citizen developed in Hong Kong (2017)
251 Sophia, a main belt asteroid (1885)
Operation Sophia or EU Navfor Med, a European Union Naval Force operation in the Mediterranean (2015)

See also
Hagia Sophia (disambiguation)
Saint Sophia (disambiguation)
Sofia (disambiguation)
Sophiology, a philosophical concept regarding wisdom, as well as a theological concept regarding the wisdom of God